Prior to 1947, the structure of the judiciary in New Jersey was extremely complex, including Court of Errors and Appeals in the last resort in all causes.  

The Court of Errors and Appeals was the highest court in the U.S. state of New Jersey from the enactment of the state's 1844 constitution until the enactment of the state's 1947 constitution.  The name of the court derived from its function of hearing appeals and correcting previous courts errors in judgment. The court was abolished by the 1947 constitution, and replaced as the state's highest court by the New Jersey Supreme Court. "In the absence of Supreme Court authority, decisions of the former Court of Errors & Appeals are binding on the Appellate Division and all trial divisions of the Superior Court, including the municipal court and Tax Court, and on all administrative agencies."

The Court of Errors and Appeals consisted of the Chancellor, the justices of the Supreme Court and six part-time judges. During that period, the Supreme Court was the intermediate appellate court for New Jersey, and its justices also presided over county-level courts, as well as serving on the Court of Errors and Appeals. The 1947 Constitution established a new Supreme Court as the highest level of the judicial system, with the appellate and trial-level judges placed in the new Superior Court.

See also
Courts of New Jersey
List of justices of the Supreme Court of New Jersey

References

Sources
New Jersey Constitution of 1844, at Wikisource

Defunct state courts of the United States

Legal history of New Jersey
1844 establishments in New Jersey
1947 disestablishments in New Jersey
Courts and tribunals established in 1844
Courts and tribunals disestablished in 1947